Alpe Adria Cup is an annual professional basketball competition for clubs from Central Europe. The league comprises teams from seven countries, namely Austria, Croatia, Czech Republic, Poland, Romania, Slovakia, and Slovenia. It is played under the rules of FIBA.

2022–23 teams

Finals

References

External links
Official website

 
Multi-national basketball leagues in Europe
2015 establishments in Europe
Basketball competitions in Austria
Basketball leagues in Slovakia
Basketball leagues in Slovenia
Basketball leagues in Croatia
Sports leagues established in 2015
Basketball cup competitions in Europe